Bókaútgáfa Menningarsjóðs (Cultural Publishing) was a major Icelandic publishing company, based in Reykjavík. Founded before 1953, its editor in 1963 was Arni Böðvarsson.

References

Publishing companies of Iceland
Mass media in Reykjavík